São Nicolau Creole is the variant of Cape Verdean Creole spoken mainly in the São Nicolau Island of Cape Verde.  It belongs to the Barlavento Creoles branch. The speakers of this form of Cape Verdean Creole are 15,000 and it is the fifth most spoken form of Creole in the language. Literature is rarely recorded but the form of the Capeverdean Creole has been recorded in music.

Characteristics
Besides the main characteristics of Barlavento Creoles the São Nicolau Creole has also the following ones:
 The progressive aspect of the present is formed by putting tâ tâ before the verbs: tâ + tâ + V.
 In the verbs that end by ~a, that sound  is represented by  when the verb is conjugated with the first person of the singular pronoun. Ex.: panhó-m’  instead of panhâ-m’  “to catch me”, levó-m’  instead of levâ-m’  “to take me”, coçó-m’  instead of coçâ-m’  “to scratch me”.
Ex.: f’djêra  instead of f’guêra  “fig tree”, patchê  instead of paquê  “because”, Pr’djíça  instead of Pr’guiíça  “Preguiça” (place name), tchím  instead of quêm  “who”.
Ex. jantâ  instead of djantâ  “to dine”, jôg’  instead of djôgu  “game”, but in words like djâ  “already”, Djõ  “John” the sound  remains.
Ex.: tabácu  instead of tabóc’  “tobacco”, frángu  instead of fróng’  “chicken”.

Vocabulary

Grammar

Phonology

Alphabet

References

Further reading
 A Parábola do Filho Pródigo no crioulo de Santiago, do Fogo, da Brava, de Santo Antão, de S. Nicolau e da Boa Vista: O crioulo de Cabo Verde (Botelho da Costa, Joaquim Vieira & Custódio José Duarte, 1886)
 O crioulo da ilha de S. Nicolau de Cabo Verde (Cardoso, Eduardo Augusto, 1989)

External links
Typical figures of São Nicolau - texts in Portuguese with the terms of glossary in São Nicolau Creole

São Nicolau, Cape Verde